Mohamed Abdul Ghanee (born 15 April 1978), commonly known as Theyravaa is a Maldivian singer and songwriter.

Early life and career
Born to a musical family, Ghanee had no interest in music even when his siblings spend their time in jamming and singing. While studying at Madhrasathul Ifthithaah, he participated in the Inter-house singing competition, on a request by his elder brother. His performance was well noted by judges and received several prizes. The success was followed by his next performance, the song "Theyravaa" which caught the attention of a member from the local music band Zero Degree Atoll, who insisted him to perform a different version of the song in the Fannaanunge Muzikee Eid Show (1992). The version, which marks his first break in the industry, was loved by the audience and he was considered "a promising singer". 

At the age of fourteen, Ghanee relocated to Male' and was enrolled to Ahmadhiyya International School and later to Malé English School which allowed him to showcase his talent as a singer. From 1996 to 1999, Ghanee was a prominent face in the Interschool Singing Competition, in which he was awarded as the Best Performer of the Competition in the year 1999. He then worked as a mentor to other students participating in the same competition. After completing studies, Ghanee joined the local band "Amazon Jade" and started performing in resorts, as a profession. Afterwards, he started performing in several music shows and national gatherings. During the time, he was more involved  with the studio albums than film songs.

In 2001, Ghanee joined "Waves Band", a group formed by Dhivehi Raajjeyge Adu, where he contributed to several studio albums. His sensuous rendition of the song 'Vee Reethi Neyngey Neyngey" from the album Yaaraa turned to be a major breakthrough in his career, where he was roped in to perform several film songs by music directors and producers. He particularly mentioned music directors, Ibrahim Nifar and Ibrahim Zaid Ali as "constant pillars" in accelerating his music career. At 6th Gaumee Film Awards ceremony, Ghanee received two nominations as the Best Male Playback Singer for his renditions in the song "Bunaa Hiyy Vey" from Zalzalaa En'buri Aun (2010) and "Vee Banavefaa Adhu Falhuvefaa" from Veeraana, where he won his first award for the former. In the following ceremony, he was bestowed with the title for a second time for his classical rendition in the romantic song "Loabivaa Ey" from Hiyy Yaara Dheefa (2011), while also being nominated for the song "Vejjey Fanaa" from the same film.

Discography

Feature film

Short film

Television and web series

Non-film songs

Religious / Madhaha

Filmography

Accolades

References 

Living people
People from Malé
1978 births
Maldivian playback singers